The Brazil–France border is the line, located in the Amazon Rainforest, that limits the territories of Brazil and France. The border is located between the Brazilian state of Amapá and the French region of Guyane.

It is the longest border France shares with another country, despite not being located in mainland France. The second longest is the one with Spain, at 
. The Oyapock River defines part of the border, and is spanned by the Oyapock River Bridge, the only bridge crossing the border, which connects the towns of Saint-Georges (Guyane) and Oiapoque (Brazil).

References

 
Brazil–France relations
Borders of Brazil
Borders of France
French Guiana
International borders